This is a list of schools in Bridgend County Borough in Wales.

Primary schools

Afon-y-Felin Primary School
Archdeacon John Lewis Primary School
Betws Primary School
Blaengarw Primary School 
Brackla Primary School
Bryncethin Primary School 
Bryncethin Primary School 
Brynmenyn Primary School 
Bryntirion Infants School 
Bryntirion Junior School 
Caerau Primary School
Cefn Cribwr Primary School
Cefn Glas Infants School 
Coety Primary School 
Corneli Primary School  
Coychurch Primary School 
Croesty Primary School 
Cwmfelin Primary School
Ffaldau Primary School 
Garth Primary School 
Litchard Primary School 
Llangewydd Junior School 
Llangynwyd Primary School
Maes yr Haul Primary School 
Mynydd Cynffig Infants School
Mynydd Cynffig Junior School  
Nantyffyllon Primary School 
Nantymoel Primary School 
Newton Primary School 
Nottage Primary School
Ogmore Vale Primary School 
Oldcastle Primary School
Pencoed Primary School 
Penybont Primary School 
Penyfai CW Primary School
Pil Primary School 
Plasnewydd Primary School 
Porthcawl Primary School
St Mary's & St Patrick's RC Primary School
St Mary's Bridgend RC Primary School
St Roberts RC Primary School
Tondu Primary School 
Trelales Primary School 
Tremains Primary School 
Tynyrheol Primary School 
West Park Primary School 
Ysgol Gymraeg Bro Ogwr 
Ysgol Gynradd Calon y Cymoedd 
Ysgol Gynradd Gymraeg Cynwyd Sant 
Ysgol Y Ferch O'r Sger Corneli

Secondary schools
Archbishop McGrath Catholic High School
Brynteg School
Bryntirion Comprehensive School 
Coleg Cymunedol Y Dderwen
Cynffig Comprehensive School 
Maesteg Comprehensive School  
Pencoed Comprehensive School 
Porthcawl Comprehensive School
Ysgol Gyfun Gymraeg Llangynwyd

Special schools
Heronsbridge School
Strinsea College 
Viltige School 
Ysgol Bryn Castell

Independent schools
St Clare's School, Newton

 
Bridgend